United States gubernatorial elections were held on November 2, 2010, in 37 states (with a special election in Utah) and two territories. These elections coincided with the elections for the United States Senate and the United States House of Representatives as well as other state and local elections. As in most midterm elections, the party controlling the White House lost ground. Democrats took five governorships from the Republicans, while Republicans took 11 governorships from the Democrats. An independent won one governorship previously held by a Republican, while a Republican won one governorship previously held by an independent. Republicans held a majority of governorships for the first time since before the 2006 elections. One state, Louisiana, had no election for governor, but it did feature a special election for lieutenant governor.

Most gains from both parties were made in races where no incumbent was running, either due to term limits or voluntary retirement. However, Republicans did defeat incumbent Democrats Ted Strickland of Ohio and Chet Culver of Iowa, and held Nevada, where Republican Jim Gibbons lost in the primary.

This is also the last time a third party candidate won in Rhode Island.

Predictions

Race summary

States

Territories and federal district

Closest races 
States where the margin of victory was under 1%:
 Minnesota, 0.4%
 Connecticut, 0.7%
 Illinois, 0.9%

States where the margin of victory was under 5%:
 Oregon, 1.1%
 Florida, 1.2%
 Guam, 1.2%
 Maine, 1.8%
 Vermont, 1.8%
 Rhode Island, 2.5%
 Ohio, 2.7%
 South Carolina, 4.3%

States where the margin of victory was under 10%:
 Wisconsin, 5.7%
 Massachusetts, 6.3%
 New Mexico, 7.2%
 New Hampshire, 7.5%
 Pennsylvania, 9.0%
 Iowa, 9.7%
Georgia, 9.8%

Red denotes states won by Republicans. Blue denotes states won by Democrats. Grey denotes states won by Independents.

Alabama

Governor Bob Riley was term-limited in 2010.

Businessman and 2002 Republican gubernatorial primary candidate Timothy James, State Representative Robert Bentley, Chancellor Bradley Byrne, and former state Supreme Court chief justice Roy Moore, were all major contenders for the Republican nomination. In the June 1 primary, Byrne finished in first place with 28.9%, followed by Robert J. Bentley who won 25.2% of the vote. Due to state law, the two were forced into a July runoff election, in which Bentley defeated Byrne by a margin of 56.1 to 43.9% to win the Republican nomination.

For the Democratic side, State Agriculture Commissioner Ron Sparks easily defeated Congressman Artur Davis of Alabama's 7th congressional district in the June 1 primary.

In the general election, Bentley defeated Sparks.

Alaska

Governor Sarah Palin was elected in 2006 with 48% of the vote and was eligible to seek reelection in 2010. On July 3, 2009, Palin announced that she would not run for reelection, and resigned on July 26, 2009. On July 26, Lt. Gov. Sean Parnell became the 12th Governor of Alaska. Parnell officially announced that he would be running for a first full-term in 2010. In August 2010 he won the Republican nomination for governor.

Parnell faced former State Representative and 2008 congressional nominee Ethan Berkowitz, and won the Democratic nomination against State Senator Hollis French, in the November election. Parnell won a first full-term.

Arizona

Democratic Governor Janet Napolitano was nominated by President Barack Obama and confirmed by the United States Senate as Secretary of Homeland Security in early 2009. Republican Secretary of State Jan Brewer was first in the state's gubernatorial line of succession and became governor upon Napolitano's subsequent resignation. Brewer was seeking a full term in 2010. She would face a primary challenge from former state Senator Karen Johnson, Tucson attorney John Munger, and State Treasurer Dean Martin.

The announced Democratic candidate was Arizona Attorney General Terry Goddard. A potential Democratic candidate could have been Phoenix mayor Phil Gordon.

Jan Brewer won the Republican primary election, and Terry Goddard won the Democratic primary election. Brewer defeated Goddard in the election.

Arkansas

Governor Mike Beebe sought a second term in 2010. He was elected with 55% of the vote in 2006.  In March 2009 Beebe's approval rating was 68%, according to Public Policy Polling.
Jim Keet, a former State Senator, was the Republican nominee.

Beebe defeated Keet in a landslide election.

California

Governor Arnold Schwarzenegger was term-limited in 2010.

Former eBay CEO Meg Whitman was the Republican nominee for the Gubernatorial election, defeating state Insurance Commissioner Steve Poizner in the California Republican Party primary.

Former Governor and current Attorney General Jerry Brown was the Democratic nominee.

Brown defeated Whitman in the general election.

Colorado

Governor Bill Ritter declined to run for re-election. He had been elected with 57% of the vote in 2006. Following Ritter's announcement, Denver Mayor John Hickenlooper announced his candidacy. Hickenlooper faced no opposition in the Democratic primary.

Businessman Dan Maes became the Republican nominee by winning the August 10 primary election.

Former Congressman Tom Tancredo ran under the banner of the American Constitution Party.

In the general, Hickenlooper decisively defeated Tancredo and Maes. Maes won only 11.6% of the vote, nearly reducing the Republican Party to minor-party status in Colorado.

Connecticut

On November 9, 2009, incumbent Governor Jodi Rell announced she would not seek a second full term in 2010. She was elected to a full term in 2006 with 63% of the vote.

The Republican nomination was won by former United States Ambassador to Ireland Thomas C. Foley, who defeated Lt. Governor Michael Fedele.

The Democratic nominee was Stamford Mayor Dan Malloy, who defeated businessman and 2006 Democratic Senatorial nominee Ned Lamont.

Florida

First-term Governor Charlie Crist was eligible to seek re-election, but decided instead to run for the United States Senate seat held by George LeMieux. After a tough primary challenge the Republican Party chose businessman Rick Scott over Florida Attorney General Bill McCollum. The Democratic Party nominated Florida CFO Alex Sink.

Crist was elected as a Republican, but left the party and became an independent during his Senate campaign.

Scott defeated Sink in the election.

Georgia

Governor Sonny Perdue was term-limited in 2010.

On the Republican side, former Secretary of State Karen Handel, and former Congressman Nathan Deal  faced each other in a runoff, defeating other candidates including state Insurance Commissioner John Oxendine in the July 20 primary. Lieutenant Governor Casey Cagle had established an exploratory committee in September 2008, but dropped out of the race on April 15, 2009 because of health problems.

On the Democratic side, former Governor Roy Barnes, whom Perdue unseated in 2002, won the July 20 primary against former state Secretary of State David Poythress, state Attorney General Thurbert Baker, and state House Minority Leader DuBose Porter.

The Libertarian Party fielded as its candidate John Monds, who served as president of the Grady County NAACP and was the first Libertarian candidate in U.S. history to receive more than one million votes, when he ran for the Georgia Public Service Commission in 2008.

Hawaii

Governor Linda Lingle was term-limited in 2010.

Republican Lieutenant Governor Duke Aiona ran.

Democratic Congressman Neil Abercrombie announced that he would run. Another possible Democratic candidate was Honolulu mayor Mufi Hannemann.

Idaho

Governor Butch Otter sought a second term in 2010. A former state legislator, lieutenant governor and Congressman, Otter was elected in 2006 with 52 percent of the vote but struggled to implement many of his policies despite an overwhelmingly Republican Idaho Legislature. In May 2010 Otter brushed aside primary challenges from Ada County commissioner Sharon Ullman and conservative activist Rex Rammell, who ran for U.S. Senate in 2008 as an independent.

Democratic primary candidates included activist and mediator Keith G. Allred, and Franklin County laborer Lon Chaney, who unsuccessfully contested the Democratic nomination in 2006. Allred easily defeated Chaney for the Democratic nomination.

Former Republican state representative Jana Kemp was an announced independent candidate.

Otter won re-election.

Illinois

Governor Pat Quinn sought a full term in 2010.
On January 29, 2009, by succession, Quinn became governor when Governor Rod Blagojevich was impeached, convicted and removed from office by the Illinois State Senate. Quinn was challenged for the Democratic nomination by State Comptroller Dan Hynes.  On February 2, Quinn defeated Hynes by a narrow margin in a 50–50 split in the statewide primary. Despite trailing by only a few thousand votes, Hynes declined a recount and conceded the election to Quinn.

The six-man Republican primary wasn't decided until March 5, 2010 when the final tally was announced. Only 193 votes (two-thousandths of one-percent) separated State Senator Bill Brady and former gubernatorial Chief of Staff Kirk Dillard, out of more than 750,000 votes. Dillard said he would not challenge the results for financial and political reasons. Political experts ABC talked with said, "unless Dillard had evidence of specific miscounting or fraud, it's not worth asking for a recount. And it's certainly better for party unity."

Quinn defeated Brady in the election.

Iowa

Governor Chet Culver sought a second term in 2010. He was elected with 54% of the vote in 2006.

Former Governor Terry Branstad, whose four terms in the governor's mansion made him the longest-serving governor in Iowa history, formed an exploratory committee for the race. Republican Congressman Steve King was the subject of some early speculation but announced that he would run for re-election to the House in August 2009. Businessman Bob Vander Plaats, who was the Republican nominee for lieutenant governor in 2006, ran and was considered an early front-runner in the Republican primary. Other Republicans seeking their party's nomination included State Representatives Christopher Rants and businessman Christian Fong. Branstad was the favorite for Republican nomination, and led incumbent Democratic Governor Chet Culver in aggregate polling.

Branstad defeated then-sitting Governor Culver in the election.

Kansas

Governor Kathleen Sebelius was term-limited in 2010. President Barack Obama nominated Sebelius as Secretary of Health and Human Services. Mark Parkinson, her replacement, did not seek a full term, and Republican Senator Sam Brownback defeated Democratic state Senator Tom Holland in the general election.

Maine

Governor John Baldacci was term-limited in 2010.

At the gubernatorial primary election on June 8, Maine Democrats chose State Senator Elizabeth "Libby" Mitchell as their nominee, while Waterville Mayor Paul LePage was chosen by the Republicans.

Three independent candidates were on the November 2 ballot: Eliot Cutler, lawyer, former staff member for U.S. Senator Edmund Muskie, and former adviser to President Jimmy Carter; Shawn Moody, business owner; and Kevin Scott, business owner.

The Maine Green Independent Party did not have a candidate on the ballot this year.

With 94% of precincts reporting on the day after the general election, the Bangor Daily News declared LePage the winner, carrying 38.1% of the votes. Cutler was in second place with 36.7% of the votes (less than 7,500 votes behind LePage), while Mitchell was a distant third with 19%. Moody and Scott had 5% and 1%, respectively.

Maryland

Governor Martin O'Malley sought a second term in 2010. He was elected with 53% of the vote in 2006.

Former Republican Governor Bob Ehrlich on March 30, 2010, announced that he would run.  In the last election, in 2006, O'Malley narrowly defeated Ehrlich, who ran as an incumbent.

In the primary, Ehrlich faced business owner Brian Murphy.

O'Malley defeated former Governor Ehrlich in the election.

Massachusetts

Incumbent first-term Governor Deval Patrick, a Democrat, sought re-election. He was elected with 56% of the vote in 2006.

Charlie Baker was the Republican candidate, while Jill Stein was the candidate of the Green-Rainbow Party.

Tim Cahill, Treasurer of Massachusetts, ran as an Independent. If Cahill had been elected, he would have been the first independent candidate to win statewide in the Commonwealth.

Patrick defeated Baker, Stein, and Cahill in the election.

Michigan

Governor Jennifer Granholm was term-limited in 2010.

The party primaries on August 3 had five Republicans and two Democrats on the ballot.

On the Republican side, businessman Rick Snyder defeated Michigan Attorney General Mike Cox, Oakland County Sheriff Mike Bouchard, Michigan State Senator Tom George and U.S. Representative Peter Hoekstra for the GOP nomination.

On the Democratic side, Lansing Mayor Virg Bernero easily defeated state House Speaker Andy Dillon for the party nomination.

In the general election Rick Snyder defeated Virg Bernero in a landslide.

Minnesota

Governor Tim Pawlenty would have been eligible to seek a third term in 2010, but decided not to run.  He won re-election by 1% in 2006, with 46.7% of the vote.

For Republicans, potential candidates included former U.S. Senator Norm Coleman, former House Minority Leader Marty Seifert, State Representative Tom Emmer, State Senator David Hann, and several other less prominent politicians, such as former State Representative Bill Haas. Former Minnesota State Auditor Patricia Anderson also sought the endorsement briefly, but later withdrew in order to again run for state auditor. As the campaign season progressed, Coleman, Hann and Haas withdrew from the contest.

Among Democrats, former U.S. Senator Mark Dayton, state senator John Marty, former State Representative Matt Entenza, former State Senator Steve Kelley, State Representative Paul Thissen, Minnesota House Speaker Margaret Anderson Kelliher, Ramsey County Attorney Susan Gaertner, State Representative Tom Rukavina, and Minneapolis Mayor R.T. Rybak all announced their candidacies. State Senator Tom Bakk withdrew from the race in March 2010. Saint Paul Mayor Chris Coleman announced that he would not run.

Minnesota House Speaker Margaret Anderson Kelliher won the endorsement of the Minnesota DFL Party, but still faced Mark Dayton and Matt Entenza in the August 10 primary. The Republican Party endorsed State Representative Tom Emmer.

In the primary, Mark Dayton won a narrow victory over DFL-endorsed candidate Margaret Anderson Kelliher. Republican-endorsed candidate Tom Emmer easily won the GOP primary. Independence Party candidate Tom Horner also won his party's primary.

Nebraska

Governor Dave Heineman succeeded Mike Johanns upon Johanns' confirmation as United States Secretary of Agriculture. Heineman won election in 2006 against David Hahn with 73% of the vote and sought a second term in 2010.

Heineman won re-election.

Nevada

Governor Jim Gibbons sought a second term in 2010. He was elected in 2006 with 48% of the vote. Gibbons, who had low approval ratings in 2009, had two announced challengers before the end of the year from within his own party. Former State Senator Joe Heck and former North Las Vegas Mayor Mike Montandon both announced that they would challenge Gibbons in the Republican primary. Former federal judge Brian Sandoval announced his candidacy for governor in September 2009. On June 8, 2010 Gibbons was defeated in the Republican primary by Sandoval.

The Democratic candidate was Rory Reid, Clark County Commissioner and the son of U.S. Senate Majority Leader Harry Reid.

The Libertarian candidate was Arthur Forest Lampitt, Jr. Before running for office, he was an IT management consultant and small business owner.

The Green candidate was David Scott Curtis, a residential designer and public artist.

New Hampshire

Governor John Lynch sought re-election in 2010. (The governors of New Hampshire and Vermont serve two-year terms.) He was re-elected with 70% of the vote in 2008.

Lynch was re-elected.

New Mexico

Governor Bill Richardson was term-limited in 2010.

Lieutenant Governor Diane Denish (D) obtained the Democratic Party nomination by winning the June 1, 2010 primary without opposition.

Doña Ana County District Attorney Susana Martinez won the Republican nominee for Governor of New Mexico by winning the June 1, 2010 primary with 51% of the vote against four other candidates.  Martinez is the first Latina woman nominated by a major party for governor anywhere in the United States.  Martinez defeated PR firm owner Doug Turner, Pete Domenici, Jr. (son of the former U.S. Senator Pete Domenici), State Representative Janice Arnold-Jones, and former Republican party state chairman Allen Weh. The election resulted in New Mexico's first female governor. Martinez defeated Denish and became the nation's first Latina governor and first female governor of New Mexico.

New York

Governor David Paterson originally announced he would seek a first full term in 2010. He became Governor of New York when Eliot Spitzer resigned amid a prostitution scandal on March 17, 2008. He was likely to face a tough primary challenge from Attorney General Andrew Cuomo, who led him (and all other opponents) in polling.  Paterson announced on February 26, 2010 that he would not be a candidate in the Democratic primary; Cuomo entered the race on May 24 of the same year. Businessman Carl Paladino defeated former Congressman Rick Lazio for the Republican nomination in a primary election, drawing heavily on support from upstate New York. Cuomo soundly defeated Paladino in the general election.

Ohio

Governor Ted Strickland sought a second term in 2010. He was elected with 60% of the vote in 2006.

John Kasich, a former congressman from Ohio's 12th congressional district and Chairman of the United States House Committee on the Budget was the Republican nominee. Recent polling showed this race to be competitive, with Rasmussen Reports polling in August 2010 showing John Kasich ahead of incumbent Governor Strickland by a 47 to 39% margin. A survey from Public Policy Polling from the same month found similar results, with Governor Strickland trailing former Congressman Kasich by a 50 to 40% margin.

Kasich defeated then-sitting Governor Strickland in the election.

Oklahoma

Democratic Governor Brad Henry was term-limited in 2010.

Two Democrats announced their candidacies: state Attorney General Drew Edmondson, and Lieutenant Governor Jari Askins, who would be Oklahoma's first female governor.

Two Republicans announced their candidacies: Congresswoman and former lieutenant governor Mary Fallin, who would also be Oklahoma's first female governor, and state Senator Randy Brogdon. Oklahoma, which tilts Republican in party affiliation, was considered a strong pickup opportunity for the GOP. Either outcome would have resulted in Oklahoma's first female governor, as both Fallin and Askins won their primaries; Fallin defeated Askins in the general election.

Oregon

Governor Ted Kulongoski was term-limited in 2010. Former two-term Governor John Kitzhaber was the Democratic nominee and former Portland Trail Blazers basketball player Chris Dudley was his Republican opponent. In the primaries, Kitzhaber defeated former state Secretary of State Bill Bradbury, and Dudley won a plurality among a large field of candidates which included former Oregon State Treasurer candidate Allen Alley and former state Representative John Lim. Greg Kord of the Constitution Party and Wes Wagner of the Libertarian Party also ran. Kitzhaber defeated Dudley in the general election; his election marked the first time in Oregon that a person had been elected to three terms as governor.

Pennsylvania

Governor Ed Rendell was term-limited in 2010.

Republican Attorney General Tom Corbett was the Republican nominee for governor.  Republican Congressman Jim Gerlach had formed an exploratory committee and initiated a campaign in 2009, but he eventually dropped out of the race in early 2010 in order to run for re-election to his seat in the House.  The Democratic nominee was Allegheny County Executive Dan Onorato. Corbett was considered the marginal favorite in a competitive election, and defeated Onorato.

Rhode Island

Governor Donald Carcieri was term-limited in 2010.

State Representative Joe Trillo was a potential Republican candidate.

On the Democratic side, State General Treasurer Frank Caprio was the de facto nominee, with Attorney General Patrick C. Lynch dropping out of the race for governor.

Former Republican Senator Lincoln D. Chafee formed an exploratory committee for a potential campaign as an independent. After deciding to run, Senator Chafee went on to win the election.

South Carolina

Governor Mark Sanford was term-limited in 2010.

On the Republican side, State Representative Nikki Haley ran, defeating Congressman Gresham Barrett in a June 22, 2010 run-off election. She had the potential to become the state's first female governor as well as its first Indian governor.

On the Democratic side, Vincent Sheheen was the candidate, having defeated all other candidates in the primary election.

Haley defeated Sheheen in the election and became South Carolina's first female governor.

South Dakota

Governor Mike Rounds was term-limited in 2010.

On the Republican side, State Senators Dave Knudson and Gordon Howie, Lieutenant Governor Dennis Daugaard, Brookings Mayor Scott Munsterman, and rancher Ken Knuppe announced that they were running.

On the Democratic side, state Senator Scott Heidepriem, who announced his candidacy in July 2009, ran unopposed. United States Representative Stephanie Herseth Sandlin, who represented the state at-large in the United States House of Representatives, announced that she would run for re-election rather than for Governor or the Senate seat  held by incumbent John Thune in 2010.

Tennessee

Democratic Governor Phil Bredesen was term-limited in 2010.

On the Republican side, Congressman Zach Wamp of the state's 3rd District, Knoxville Mayor Bill Haslam, and military veteran, internet sensation, and activist Basil Marceaux  and Lieutenant Governor Ron Ramsey announced their candidacies. Haslam was the Republican nominee for governor.

Businessman Mike McWherter (son of a former Tennessee governor) ran for the Democratic nomination.

There were several independent candidates as well, including Toni K. Hall, a college economics instructor.

Several non-partisan sources determined that the race was leaning Republican, and Haslam soundly defeated McWherter.

Texas

Texas Governor Rick Perry won the GOP gubernatorial primary with 51% of the vote on March 2, 2010. Perry sought a third full term, as the longest-serving governor in the history of Texas. U.S. Senator Kay Bailey Hutchison challenged Perry in the Republican primary. On December 4, 2008, Hutchison filed papers to set up an exploratory committee and confirmed in July 2009 that she would be making her official entry into the race in August. Perry led in primary and general election match-ups, according to aggregate polling. Dedra Medina also challenged Perry and Hutchison for Republican nomination.

Former Houston Mayor Bill White won the Texas Democratic primary, beating Houston businessman Farouk Shami.

Perry defeated White in the election.

Utah (special)

Governor Jon Huntsman, Jr. was nominated by President Barack Obama and confirmed by the Senate as the United States Ambassador to China. Lt. Governor Gary Herbert became governor on August 11, 2009. Utah law requires that a special election be held in 2010 to fill the remainder of the term, which expired on January 7, 2013. Herbert sought election and won the general election in this conservative state.

The Democratic nominee was Salt Lake County Mayor Peter Corroon, who won his party's nomination unopposed at the Democratic Party Convention.

Vermont

Governor Jim Douglas retired rather than seeking a fifth two-year term in 2010.  (The governors of Vermont and New Hampshire serve two-year terms.) Douglas was re-elected in 2008 with 53% of the vote. Republican Lieutenant Governor Brian Dubie announced his candidacy. Former State Auditor and current State Senator Randy Brock, who is African-American, was rumored as a possible Republican candidate.

Peter Shumlin won the Democratic primary according to the uncertified tabulation of statewide votes released by the Office of the Secretary of State on August 27, 2010, by 197 votes over Doug Racine, who requested a recount.

Wisconsin

Governor Jim Doyle retired rather than seek re-election. He was re-elected with 53% of the vote in 2006. The resignation of his legal counsel as well as dipping poll numbers may have contributed to his decision to not seek re-election.

Democratic Lt. Governor Barbara Lawton said in a statement on October 26, 2009 that she would not seek the Democratic nomination for governor. Milwaukee mayor Tom Barrett and Jared Gary Christiansen both filed to run as Democrats.

On April 28, 2009, Milwaukee County Executive Scott Walker announced that he would seek the Republican nomination for governor. Former Congressman Mark Neumann indicated that he too would enter the Republican primary by the fall of 2009. A third candidate, Appleton businessman Mark Todd, filed as well.

Raymond L. Ertl ran as an Independent. He ran a grassroots campaign, and was based out of Milwaukee's East Side.

On November 2, 2010, in the general election, Republican Scott Walker defeated Democrat Tom Barrett to become the 45th governor of Wisconsin.

Wyoming

Governor Dave Freudenthal was term-limited in 2010, but a 2010 Wyoming Supreme Court ruling invalidated legislative term-limits. Freudenthal announced on March 4, 2010, that he would not seek a third term.

Former U.S. Attorney Matt Mead, a Republican, defeated former state Democratic Party Chairwoman Leslie Petersen in a landslide.

Territories

Guam

Governor Felix Camacho was term-limited in 2010. Lieutenant Governor Michael W. Cruz, a surgeon and veteran of the Gulf War and Iraq War, ran for the Republican nomination against Senator Eddie B. Calvo. On the Democratic side, former governor Carl Gutierrez announced that he would run. Attorney Mike Phillips was considered a bid for the governorship.

U.S. Virgin Islands

Incumbent Governor John de Jongh sought re-election for a second term in 2010. He was elected with 57% of the vote (in a runoff) in 2006 over Kenneth Mapp.

On September 11, 2010, Governor John de Jongh won the Democratic primary election with 53% of the vote. De Jongh defeated Senator Adlah Donastorg, former Lt. Governor Gerard Luz James and James O'Bryan Jr. with more votes than all three of his Democratic challengers combined.

De Jongh faced independent candidate Kenneth Mapp, a former Lieutenant Governor of the United States Virgin Islands, in the general election on November 2, 2010.

De Jongh defeated Mapp in the election.

See also
2010 United States elections
2010 United States Senate elections
2010 United States House of Representatives elections

Notes

References

External links
Candidates at Project Vote Smart
Governors from OurCampaigns.com
The Polls: 2010 Gubernatorial Elections from Pollster.com
Election 2010: Governor Elections from Rasmussen Reports
2010 Governor Races from Real Clear Politics
Campaign contributions at FollowTheMoney.org
2010 Gubernatorial Elections at the National Governors Association

 
November 2010 events in the United States